Rever may refer to:

 Réver Humberto Alves Araújo (born 1985), Brazilian football player
 "Rêver", song by Mylène Farmer
 Rever, in clothing construction, a type of collar or lapel made from the same piece of fabric as the rest of the garment.
 Judi Rever, Canadian journalist and author of In Praise of Blood
 "Rever", song by Bicep from their 2021 album Isles
 Rever, an album by Larsen released on Young God Records